The 1972 Daytona 500, the 14th running of the event, was held on February 20, 1972, at Daytona International Speedway in Daytona Beach, Florida. A. J. Foyt, driving a 1971 Mercury, won the race.

First Daytona 500 starts for David Sisco and Walter Ballard. Only Daytona 500 start for Richard D. Brown, George Altheide, David Ray Boggs, Ed Hessert, Larry Dickson, Jimmy Finger, Mark Donohue, and Raymond Williams. Last Daytona 500 starts for Vic Elford, Henley Grey, Ben Arnold, Bill Seifert, Elmo Langley, and Bill Champion.

Summary 
Foyt drove his number 21 to victory after starting the race from the outside front-row position.  There were three cautions flags which slowed the race for a total of 17 laps.  Foyt dominated the event, winning by almost two laps over his closest competitor.  The victory over Charlie Glotzbach was Foyt's first win of the season.

The 1972 Daytona 500 has the distinction of being the event which had the fewest leaders for a NASCAR race held at Daytona International Speedway; with only Foyt, Richard Petty, and Bobby Allison recorded as leading a lap during the competition.  The Daytona 500 was the second event held during the 1972 season, and completed in three hours and five minutes with an average speed of 161 mph.  There were a total of 13 lead changes between Foyt, Allison, and Petty throughout the race.

Foyt's victory would earn him a spot on the cover of Sports Illustrated, the first time for a reigning Daytona 500 champion.

Walter Ballard had a huge crash in this race on lap 16 as a result of getting together with Buddy Baker in the tri-oval. Baker himself would disappear from the race on lap 18. Ballard went upside down after climbing the nose of Baker's car. He rolled into the tri-oval grass and barrel rolled 3 times before coming back onto all fours. Both drivers were uninjured.

Raymond Williams earned the dubious honor of being the only driver ever to both begin and finish in last-place in the same Daytona 500. Also, attrition was through the roof in this race, as only 26 cars even made it 200 miles, just 22 cars ran at least half the race, and just 19 made it 110 laps. Also, the distances between some of the leading finishers were just astounding. Third-place finisher Jim Vandiver (and fourth-place Benny Parsons) was six laps/15 miles behind the winner, fifth-place James Hylton was 9 laps/22.5 miles behind, sixth-place Cale Yarborough was 12 laps/30 miles or 6% of the race distance behind, and 10th-place finisher Vic Elford was 18 laps/45 miles or 9% of the race distance behind Foyt.

Bobby Isaac won the pole but A.J. Foyt overtook him right at the start although the two fought for the lead on the first lap. As Foyt pulled away Issac's day turned out to be a short one as engine problems put the K&K Insurance Dodge on the trailer before the 10 percent mark of the race.

Statistics 
Reference:

References 

Daytona 500
NASCAR races at Daytona International Speedway
Daytona 500
Daytona 500